Gerald Tennyson Kenney (born June 30, 1945) is an American former Major League Baseball infielder. He is from Beloit, Wisconsin.

Baseball career
The second hit of his major league career was an inside-the-park home run with the New York Yankees in 1967. He played for the Yankees in 120 games or more in 1969, 1970 and 1971. He also had appearances for the Yankees in 1967 and 1972. He, along with John Ellis, Charlie Spikes and Rusty Torres, was traded from the Yankees to the Cleveland Indians for Graig Nettles and Jerry Moses at the Winter Meetings on November 27, 1972. He played five games for the Indians in his final season in 1973.  He was signed by Yankees scout Lou Maguolo.

References

External links

1945 births
Living people
Sportspeople from Beloit, Wisconsin
New York Yankees players
Cleveland Indians players
Syracuse Chiefs players
Baseball players from Wisconsin
Baseball players from St. Louis
Major League Baseball third basemen
Binghamton Triplets players
Columbus Confederate Yankees players
Florida Instructional League Yankees players
Shelby Yankees players